Fricis Rokpelnis ( in Grobiņa, Courland, Russian Empire – 15 September 1969 in Jūrmala, Latvian SSR) was a Latvian poet and writer, who is best known for writing the lyrics to the Anthem of the Latvian Soviet Socialist Republic.

Biography
Born in Kurzeme, to a poor family. After the occupation of Latvia in 1940, Rockpelnis worked closely with the communist regime, becoming one of the most visible collaborators who came from the Latvian literary environment. From 1947. A member of the CPSU, Rokpelnis held various high administrative positions and co-authored the anthem of the Latvian SSR. He was also a USSR Supreme Council Member (1946-1950) and Latvian SSR Supreme Council Member (1950-1954). Fricis Rokpelnis was the father of poet Janis Rokpelnis.

Literatures
Major works:
Collection of poems "A A sister star on the flag" (1950)
Selection "Rye bread" (1959)
The play "The Light" (1945)
The play "Rainy Youth" (1948)
Film Festival "Rainis" (1949)
movie theater for the film "Atbalss" (1959)
He also wrote libretto for the Soviet political propaganda opera "On the New Coast" (1954) and "Audriņi" (1963).

References

1909 births
1969 deaths
People from Grobiņa
Latvian writers
Soviet writers